The men's decathlon event at the 1965 Summer Universiade was held at the People's Stadium in Budapest on 26 and 27 August 1965.

Results

References

Athletics at the 1965 Summer Universiade
1965